Wayne Township is one of the fourteen townships of Jefferson County, Ohio, United States.  The 2010 census found 2,232 people in the township, 2,030 of whom lived in the unincorporated portions of the township.

Geography
Located in the western part of the county, it borders the following townships:
Salem Township - north
Island Creek Township - northeast corner
Cross Creek Township - east
Wells Township - southeast
Smithfield Township - south
Green Township, Harrison County - southwest
German Township, Harrison County - northwest

The village of Bloomingdale is located in central Wayne Township.

Name and history
Wayne Township was founded in 1805.

It is one of twenty Wayne Townships statewide.

Government
The township is governed by a three-member board of trustees, who are elected in November of odd-numbered years to a four-year term beginning on the following January 1. Two are elected in the year after the presidential election and one is elected in the year before it. There is also an elected township fiscal officer, who serves a four-year term beginning on April 1 of the year after the election, which is held in November of the year before the presidential election. Vacancies in the fiscal officership or on the board of trustees are filled by the remaining trustees.

References

External links
County website

Townships in Jefferson County, Ohio
Townships in Ohio